Bride of the Gorilla is a 1951 horror B-movie film written and directed by Curt Siodmak starring Raymond Burr, Lon Chaney Jr., Barbara Payton and Tom Conway.

Plot
Deep in the Latin American jungles, plantation manager Barney Chavez (Burr) kills his elderly employer in order to get to his beautiful wife Dina Van Gelder (Payton). However, old native witch Al-Long (Gisela Werbisek) witnesses the crime and puts a curse on Barney, who soon after finds himself turning nightly into a rampaging gorilla-like beast. When a wise but superstitious police commissioner Taro (Chaney) is brought in to investigate the plantation owner's death and a rash of strange animal killings, he begins to suspect that all is not as it seems. Taro interviews local farmers who have seen the bloodthirsty animal; they identify it as the "Sukara," a mythical jungle demon resembling a gorilla. Meanwhile, Dina is also becoming suspicious of Barney, who seems to be more in love with the jungle than with her. She follows him one night into the jungle, only to be attacked by the feral Barney. Taro and his friend Dr. Viet (Conway) follow her screams in the jungle and shoot Barney. Before he dies, Barney peers into his reflection from a pond and sees sukara staring back at him.

Cast
 Raymond Burr as Barney Chavez
 Barbara Payton as Dina Van Gelder
 Lon Chaney Jr. as Police Commissioner Taro (credited as Lon Chaney)
 Tom Conway as Dr. Viet
 Gisela Werbisek as Al-Long (credited as Giselle Werbisek)
 Carol Varga as Larina
 Paul Cavanagh as Klaas Van Gelder
 Paul Maxey as Van Heusen
 Woody Strode as Nedo (Policeman)
 Felippa Rock as Stella Van Heusen
 Moyna Macgill as Mrs. Van Heusen
 Steve Calvert as Gorilla (uncredited)

Production

The film was shot in 10 days. Edward G. Robinson Jr. was originally cast in the film but was fired by the producers after his arrest for writing a bad check for $138 to the Laguna Beach Garage. The gorilla of the movie's title only appears in the last few minutes of the film. The film's working title was The Face in the Water. Curt Siodmak considered switching the roles of Lon Chaney Jr. and Raymond Burr, but because of Chaney's deteriorating appearance, the idea was dropped.

See also
 Sisimito
 List of films in the public domain in the United States

References

External links

 

 

Jack Broder Productions Inc. films
1951 horror films
1951 films
American science fiction horror films
American black-and-white films
1950s English-language films
Films with screenplays by Curt Siodmak
Films directed by Curt Siodmak
1950s science fiction horror films
Films about curses
Films set in jungles
Films set in South America
Films about shapeshifting
Bigfoot films
Films about gorillas
Films scored by Raoul Kraushaar
1950s American films